"David Doesn't Eat" is a single by German hard dance band Scooter. It was released on 14 October 2011 as the third single from their fifteenth studio album The Big Mash Up. The song samples "A Walk in the Park" by Nick Straker Band.

Track listing 

CD Single (2-track) / Download

Other official versions
There is a shortened version of "David Doesn't Eat" (Eric Chase Remix) (2:42) released on various artists' compilation, titled Kontor House Of House, Volume 13 on physical media or Kontor House Of House - Winter Edition 2012 as digital download.

Credits and personnel 
Credits adapted from "David Doesn't Eat" CD single liner notes.

Musicians & Producers
H.P. Baxxter a.k.a. 'MC No 1' – MC lyrics, producer, performer, programmer
Rick J. Jordan – mixer, engineer, producer, performer, programmer
Michael Simon – mixer, engineer, producer, performer, programmer
Achim Jannsen – mixer, engineer

Business
Jens Thele – management

Packaging
Martin Weiland – artwork
Michaela Kuhn (Licht Form Arte) – photography

Chart performance

References

External links
 Scooter Official website

Scooter (band) songs
2011 singles
Songs written by H.P. Baxxter
Songs written by Rick J. Jordan
Songs written by Jens Thele
Songs written by Michael Simon (DJ)
2011 songs
Songs written by Nick Straker